Peter Bullock may refer to:
 Peter Bullock (scientist) (1937–2008), soil scientist and Nobel Peace Prize winner
 Peter Bullock (footballer) (born 1941), English footballer who played as an inside forward
 Peter Bullock (died 1601), English bookbinder executed at Tyburn with James Duckett
 Peter Bullock (cricketer) (1925–1997), English cricketer